Venetian cuisine, from the city of Venice, Italy
or more widely from the region of Veneto, has a centuries-long history and differs significantly from other cuisines of northern Italy (notably Friuli-Venezia Giulia and Trentino-Alto Adige/Südtirol), and of neighbouring Austria and of Slavic countries (notably Slovenia and Croatia), despite sharing some commonalities.

Overview 
Cuisine in Veneto may be divided into three main categories, based on geography: the coastal areas, the plains, and the mountains. Each one (especially the plains) can have many local cuisines, each city with its own dishes.

The most common dish is polenta, which is cooked in various ways within the local cuisines of Veneto. Polenta once was the universal staple food of the poorer classes, who could afford little else. In Veneto, the corns are ground in much smaller fragments in comparison with the rest of Italy: so, when cooked, it resembles a pudding.

Typical of many coastal areas, communities along the coast of the Laguna Veneta serve mainly seafood dishes.

In the plains it is very popular to serve grilled meat (often by a barbecue, and in a mix of pork, beef and chicken meat) together with grilled polenta, potatoes or vegetables. Other popular dishes include risotto, rice cooked with many different kinds of food, from vegetables, mushrooms, pumpkin or radicchio  to seafood, pork meat or chicken livers. Bigoli (a typical Venetian fresh pasta, similar to Udon), fettuccine (hand-made noodles), ravioli and the similar tortelli (filled with meat, cheese, vegetables or pumpkin) and gnocchi (potatoes-made fresh pasta), are fresh and often hand-made pasta dishes (made of eggs and wheat flour), served together with meat sauce (ragù) often made with duck meat, sometimes together with mushrooms or peas, or simply with melted butter.

Cuisine from the mountain areas is mainly made of pork or game meat, with polenta, as well as mushrooms or cheeses (made by cow milk), and some dish from Austrian or Tyrolese tradition, such as canederli or strudel. A typical dish is casunziei, hand-made fresh pasta similar to ravioli.

Among the typical seasoning of Venetian cuisine, you can find butter, olive oil, sunflower oil, vinegar, kren, senape, mostarda, salsa verde.

The following are dishes typical of the three subregions of the Veneto. The page for Venetian language provides additional information on writing and pronouncing the dishes' names.

Venice and the lagoon

Bigołi in salsa: bigoli pasta served with an anchovy and onion sauce.
Fegato ała venesiana: a high-class Venetian plate of liver, chopped and cooked together with chopped onions.
Mołeche: fried soft-shell crab of the species (Carcinus maenas). Mołeche are very valuable because the process of molting in the brackish lagoons only lasts a few hours, after which the shell hardens and the crab is again called maxenete.
Pasta e faxioi: bean soup with noodles (typically long pasta rough).
Połenta e schie: small shrimp from the lagoon (gray mud, gray-brown from boiled), fried and perched on a bed of very soft, white polenta.
Rixi e bixi: a poor but tasty dish consisting of a simple risotto with pancetta and peas cooked in a broth.
Rixoto de gò: rice prepared with goby (of the Gobius ophiocephalus species), also known as gò, typical fish of the Venetian Lagoon.
Sarde in saor: fried sardines, dipped in partially fried onion in the same oil in which the sardines are fried, raisins and pine nuts (traditionally only by winter to increase the calories), other spices and sprinkled with plenty of vinegar. One leaves everything to marinate at least one night.
Sepe al nero: cuttlefish cooked with their ink lagoon.

Among the many Venetian desserts, the most well-known are:
Baicołi (or baicoli).
Fritołe (or frittelle).
Pinza (or pinsa): an Epiphany cake based on cornmeal and mixed dried fruits (usually figs and raisins) and nuts.
Xałeti (or ): cornmeal biscotti with raisins.

Verona

Brasato all'Amarone: braised beef meat cooked with Amarone wine, often served together with polenta.
Gnocchi. It is tradition to eat homemade potato gnocchi on Venerdì Gnocolar, the last Friday of Carnival.
Lesso e pearà. Lesso is the bollito misto popular across entire northern Italy, that in Verona is uniquely served with pearà: a thick, slow cooking sauce made from the boiled meats' stock, grated stale bread, ox marrow and abundant ground black pepper. Some recipes also add olive oil, grated Parmigiano Reggiano or butter. The sauce's name comes from pear, dialect for pepper; hence pearà, "peppered". In the past this was a lavish meal for the majority of the populace and therefore served on major festivities like Christmas.
Pastissada de caval: an ancient horse meat stew dating back to the Middle-Age. It's prepared with bay leaves, nutmeg, cloves, salt, pepper, vegetables, and beef stock and slow cooked until the meat melts; it's served with polenta.
Polenta e renga: polenta accompanied by typical oil preserved herrings. Salted herrings (renga) are boiled or grilled, then cleaned, cut into pieces, and pickled in olive oil with garlic, parsley and capers; after 40 days of maturation, the herrings are ready to be served or put into jars for preservation. This dish originated in the Parona neighbourhood of Verona (and more broadly or the whole city) and is traditionally eaten on Ash Wednesday.
Riso Vialone Nano: a rice variety typical of southern Veronese lowlands (Bassa Veronese). It lends itself best to the preparation of excellent risottos, and used as such throughout Veneto and Italy.
Risotto all'Amarone: risotto with the local Amarone red wine. It is typical of the Valpolicella wine region.
Rixoto col tastasal: risotto made with the same seasoned ground pork used in salame and sausages; traditionally this dish was a mean of tasting the mix before making sausages (hence the name tastasal, "to taste salt").
Tortellini di Valeggio: hand-made fresh pasta of tortellini kind, stuffed with a mix of beef, pork meats and vegetables, usually served with melted butter and sage. They are typical of the town of Valeggio sul Mincio, southwest of Verona.

Desserts
Mandorlato: typical hard torrone, made in the town of Cologna Veneta.
Nadalin: an ancient predecessor of the Pandoro. It has a flatter shape and firmer texture than its more famous counterpart.
Pandoro: the traditional Christmas sweet yeast bread, now well-known and eaten all over Italy.
Tiramisù: a relatively recent recipe that has allegedly been invented in Treviso in the late 60's.

Vicenza

Vicenza, along with Venice, has one of the most distinctive cuisines in the Veneto. Previously, the Vicentians were often referred to as the magnagati or mangiagatti (meaning "cat eaters") due to the alleged presence of cats in their cuisine (caused from poverty in the past and during World War II), though the cooking of cats is now illegal in Italy. Typical plates of the city and the surrounding area include:
Asiago cheese.
Bacałà ała Visentina.
Bassano del Grappa asparaguses.
I bixi de Lumignan and i bixi de Borso ("bixi" means peas).
Cren: horseradish. It's usually finely grated and mixed with vinegar into a sauce that accompanies boiled meats.
Nanto truffles.
Paèta al malgaragno (young turkey with pomegranate juice).
Rixi e bixi (rice and peas).
Rotzo potatoes.
Rubbio celery.
Semi-liquid polenta (sometimes served with tomato sauce or puree).
Serexe de Marostega (Marostica cherries).
Torexani de Breganse.

Other provinces and regional dishes

Bigołi co'ł'arna: bigoli pasta served together with a duck meat sauce.
Bixàto (or Anguilla): eel; a typical dish of south-eastern Veneto, in the delta of river Po, it can be roasted or fried.
Carpaccio.
Casunziei.
Frittura di pesce: fried seafood served together with polenta; typical dish of the coast of Adriatic Sea.
Galletto alla brace: grilled cockerel.
Gallina alla canèvera: a dish from a very old Padua or Vicenza tradition, dating back to the Middle-Age, in which hen meat is boiled together with mixed vegetables inside a pork bladder.
Gnocchi burro, zucchero e cannella: potato gnocchi served with butter and a mix of sugar and cinnamon; sometime grated Grana cheese is added.
Gran bollito veneto (or bollito misto alla veneta): mixed boiled meats, beef, hen, beef tongue, cotechino, cooked together.
Grigliata mista: mixed grilled meats, as pork ribs, pork sausages, pork chops, chicken breasts, bacon strips, beef ribs, always served together with sliced, grilled polenta.
Maiale al latte: braised pork meat, cooked in milk.
Oca in onto: a goose marinated for some days in salt or herbs and under its own fat, and later cooked. Typical of the area of Padua.
Pasta e faxioi ała veneta: a soup made by pasta, beans and bacon.
Pastìn: a typical food from Belluno, consists of mixed pork and beef meat, cut anyhow. Spices may be added in it, and this food is often eaten along with polenta.
Patata mericana: sweet potato; a typical fall dish, it can be served boiled or roasted.
Połenta bianca: a variety of polenta made from white corn biancoperla, it is typical of the plain areas but above all of the territories of Padua, Venice and Treviso.
Połenta e oxełi: spit roasted small game birds like larks, thrushes, house sparrows and quails, served together with polenta. Under the Republic of Venice this dish spread to eastern Lombardy territories, and in Bergamo a cake took the same name (polenta e osei).
Porchetta trevigiana: often stuffed inside a panino.
Radicchio alla griglia: a Trevisan-based plate of grilled endive leaves.
Rixoto coi figadełi (risotto ai fegatini): risotto made with chicken livers; it was the main dish during the wedding banquet of common people. 
Sfilacci di cavallo: frayed dried horse meat, typical of Padua and its province, it can be traditionally used to dress a bigoli dish or eaten alone, but in modern years it is popular also to dress a pizza.
Soppressa: typical soft salami, traditionally containing garlic.
Spezzatino di musso: donkey stew, served with polenta.
Tripe ała veneta: tripe cooked with vegetables, butter and olive oil, then to be served dressed with grated grana cheese.

Desserts
Fugasa: an Easter sweet bread.
Galani (or crostoli).
Tiramisu: one of the most popular desserts in Italy and Europe, it is made with fresh eggs, mascarpone, Marsala and dark-coffee-dipped savoiardi (ladyfinger biscuits).

Alcoholic beverages

Prosecco: a popular sparkling wine, which is often secco, which is dry, or amabile, which gives it a relatively sweet taste.
Bianco di Custoza: wine cultivated in the Custoza region near lake Garda.
Spritz Veneziano.

See also

 Italian cuisine

References

 
Culture in Venice